Euphorbia cedrorum is a species of flowering plant in the family Euphorbiaceae endemic to Madagascar.

Distribution and habitat
Although described in 1993 from a cultivated specimen, in the wild the species is known only from one single later collection on the side of the Antananarivo-Tulear road, Tulear (Toliara) area, in south-west Madagascar. Only a few mature specimens are known to occur within this only known locality. Based on this collection, its natural habitat appears to be subtropical or tropical dry shrubland.

Conservation
Very little is known about the status of the species, but it appears not to be common. Its habitat is considered to be threatened by clearing for farming and charcoal burning.

References

Endemic flora of Madagascar
cedrorum
Endangered plants
Taxonomy articles created by Polbot